Iyana-Iba is a place in Ojo local government area, Lagos state, Nigeria.

Geography 
Iyana-Iba is a busy area in Lagos state due to its popular local markets and road dimension which leads to Festac, Mile 2, Alaba etc. The Iyana-Iba road also lead to the Lagos State University main gate facing the south and the back gate facing the east.

Market 
It is surrounded with local markets well known in Lagos state.

See also 
 List of markets in Lagos

Education Close-by 
 Lagos State University

References 

Populated places in Lagos State
Lagos Mainland